William E. Gorder (March 21, 1929 – August 3, 2017), was an American politician, teacher, and farmer.

Gorder was born in Grafton, North Dakota. He served in the United States Army during the Korean War. Gorder received his bachelor's and master's degrees from University of North Dakota. Gorder taught in high schools in Minto, North Dakota and Karlstad, Minnesota. He served on the Walsh County, North Dakota Board  of Commissioners and was a Republican. He also served in the North Dakota House of Representatives from 1979 to 1984 and from 1991 to 2000. Gorder died at the Lutheran Sunset Home in Grafton, North Dakota.

References

1929 births
2017 deaths
People from Walsh County, North Dakota
Military personnel from North Dakota
University of North Dakota alumni
Schoolteachers from North Dakota
Farmers from North Dakota
County commissioners in North Dakota
Republican Party members of the North Dakota House of Representatives